The Polish Institute of International Affairs (PISM) in Warsaw is a Polish think tank which carries out research and training in international relations. In this field, it ranks as one of the most influential think tanks not just in Central and Eastern Europe but in the European Union as a whole.

History of PISM 
PISM was established by the Parliament of the Republic of Poland in 1947. In 1972, the institute gained the right to confer doctoral degrees, of which the first recipient was Jerzy Robert Nowak. In 1993, the institute was closed and an “Office of International Studies – Institute of International Affairs” was created under the Ministry of Foreign Affairs. In 1996 the institute was reactivated, this time under the name Polish Institute of International Affairs. PISM is funded principally from the Polish state budget and it works closely with the Polish foreign and defense ministries.

Activities of PISM 
With a permanent research staff of thirty-five, PISM is prolific in the fields of European and European Union affairs, European Neighbourhood Policy with a particular emphasis on Ukraine, EU security policy, arms control and energy. The institute has produced notable reports not least on the question of missile defense, British efforts to renegotiate the EU treaties and the future of the EU, as well as being part of the international drafting committee for projects on a Euro-Atlantic/Eurasian Security Community and a European Global Strategy. PISM is one of the twenty-six members of the global Council of Councils, the think-tank counterpart to the G-20 major economies. Besides its core tasks of research and analysis, PISM organizes regular discussions with international dignitaries and has played host to personalities such as Henry Kissinger as well as then US presidential candidate Mitt Romney.

Directors
1947 – Marion Mushkat
 1947–1948 – Aleksander Weryka
 1949–1951 – Marian Muszkat
 1951–1957 – Julian Katz-Suchy
1957–1960 – Julian Hochfeld
 1960–1964 – Ostap Dłuski
 1964–1968 – Adam Kruczkowski
 1968–1971 – Ryszard Frelek
 1971–1980 – Marian Dobrosielski
 1980–1987 – Janusz Symonides
 1987–1991 – Maciej Perczyński
 1991–1993 – Antoni Kamiński
 1994–1996 – PISM as MFA unit
 1999–2004 – Ryszard Stemplowski
 2004–2005 – Jacek Foks (acting director)
2005–2007 – Roman Kuźniar
2007–2010 – Sławomir Dębski
2010–2015 – Marcin Zaborowski 
2015–2016 – Anna Zielińska-Rakowicz (acting director)
2016– – Sławomir Dębski

References

External links 
 Polish Institute of International Affairs(PISM)
 Profile Aleksandra Gawlikowska-Fyk, Head of the Energy Programme
 Profile Patrycja Sasnal, Head of Middle East Project
 Profile Marcin Terlikowski, Head of the European Security and Defence Economics Project

Security studies
Organisations based in Warsaw
Think tanks based in Poland
Political and economic think tanks based in Europe
Foreign policy and strategy think tanks
1947 establishments in Poland
Think tanks established in 1947